Moćevići  is a small hamlet in the municipality of Pljevlja, Montenegro. It is located at the Bosnian border.

Demographics
According to the 2003 census, the village had a population of 11 people.

References

Populated places in Pljevlja Municipality